Anax bangweuluensis, the swamp emperor,  is a species of dragonfly in the family Aeshnidae. It is found in Botswana and Zambia. Its natural habitats are rivers and swamps.

References

Aeshnidae
Insects described in 1955
Taxonomy articles created by Polbot